Vilmos Nagy is a Hungarian sprint canoer who competed in the early 1970s. He won a silver medal in the K-2 10000 m event at the 1970 ICF Canoe Sprint World Championships in Copenhagen.

References

Hungarian male canoeists
Living people
Year of birth missing (living people)
ICF Canoe Sprint World Championships medalists in kayak